Chen Hung-chang (born 2 March 1956) is a Taiwanese politician.

Education

Political career
Chen was first elected to the Legislative Yuan in 1992, representing Taipei County. He was reelected in 1995, 1998, and 2001, as a legislator from Taipei County 2. Chen was known for voting against the Kuomintang party caucus during his legislative tenure. Prior to the finalization of the Pan-Blue Coalition presidential ticket for the 2004 presidential election, Chen proposed that Ma Ying-jeou and Wang Jin-pyng form a Kuomintang presidential ticket. After the coalition ticket of Lien Chan and James Soong lost the election, Chen spoke out against a proposal to merge the People First Party into the Kuomintang.

He also served on the Kuomintang Central Review Committee.

Chen made critical statements of the Kuomintang's 2020 presidential candidate, Han Kuo-yu, in August 2019, for which the party revoked his membership. After his expulsion, Chen stated that he would remain a political independent.

Personal life
Chen has a son.

References

1956 births
Living people
Members of the 2nd Legislative Yuan
Members of the 3rd Legislative Yuan
Members of the 4th Legislative Yuan
Members of the 5th Legislative Yuan
Kuomintang Members of the Legislative Yuan in Taiwan
Expelled members of the Kuomintang
University of the East alumni
Taiwanese people of Hoklo descent
Taiwanese expatriates in the Philippines
New Taipei Members of the Legislative Yuan